Mesosa harmandi is a species of beetle in the family Cerambycidae. It was described by Stephan von Breuning in 1970. It is known from Vietnam.

References

harmandi
Beetles described in 1970